Class Reunion is a popular television show broadcast in Ireland on RTÉ One.

Overview 
Roughly based on the British programme, This Is Your Life, the show is hosted by Gay Byrne and was broadcast on Sunday nights in early 2005.  Ten shows were broadcast in the series which features a special guest who has achieved outstanding success in areas such as art, film, business or sport.  The special guest is then reunited with their old classmates, and they relive old memories and stories.  Guests have included Adi Roche, Mary O'Rourke, Pat Spillane and Dana.  It is expected that the show may return for a second series.

References 

2005 Irish television series debuts
2005 Irish television series endings
Class reunions in popular culture
RTÉ original programming